Elizabeth Arnold (born 1958) is an American poet.

She graduated from University of Chicago, with a PhD.  She teaches at the University of Maryland.

Her work has appeared in Poetry, Slate, TriQuarterly, Conjunctions, Antioch Review, Chicago Review, Sagetrieb, Literary Imagination, Gulf Coast, The Carolina Review, Tikkun, Pequod, Smartish Pace, Poetry Daily, Kalliope, and Shankpain.

Awards
 2003 and 2006 Pushcart Prize Nominee in Poetry
 2002 Whiting Award
 2002 Robert Frost Fellowship and Scholarship (1997), Bread Loaf Writers Conference
 1997–1998 Lannan Fellowship in poetry at the Fine Arts Work Center in Provincetown
 1995 Yaddo Fellowship

Works

"The South"; "Seepage", Slate, July 11, 2001
"Epic Simile", Slate, October 7, 2003
"The Horseman". Kalliope, 1999.
Books

References

External links
"Elizabeth Reading at Artomatic", Smartish Pace, June 12, 2009
Profile at The Whiting Foundation

1958 births
Living people
American women poets
University of Chicago alumni
University of Maryland, College Park faculty
21st-century American poets
21st-century American women writers